Monte Stocker (December 27, 1931 – July 15, 2008) was an American rower. He competed in the men's coxed four event at the 1960 Summer Olympics.

References

External links
 

1931 births
2008 deaths
American male rowers
Olympic rowers of the United States
Rowers at the 1960 Summer Olympics
Rowers from Seattle